Two railway stations in Kent were named Southborough.

The London, Chatham and Dover Railway had a station near Bromley named "Southborough", it was renamed 
The South Eastern Railway also had a station named "Southborough", it was renamed .

See also
Southborough (MBTA station), Massachusetts, USA